Cyber-Tec is the debut EP of C-Tec, released on August 1, 1995 by Synthetic Symphony. The release peaked at #7 on the CMJ RPM Chart in the U.S..

Reception 
Larry Dean Miles of Black Monday recommended Cyber-Tec to techno listeners interested in dance but noted "all the songs sound alike, it gets very repetitive." Sonic Boom said "I think that while there are only really four distinct songs on this EP, they all do an excellent job of providing the listener with a wide inflection of vocals from slower lyrical style used in 'Human' to the more traditional EBM speed employed on "Cauterize"."

Track listing

Personnel 
Adapted from the Cyber-Tec liner notes.

Cyber-Tec Project
 Ged Denton – instruments
 Jean-Luc De Meyer – vocals, instruments
 Jonathan Sharp – instruments

Production and design
 Keith Banks – mastering
 Zalman Fishman – executive-production
 Bruno Marcandella – cover art, design
 Paul Michael Green – photography

Release history

References

External links 
 
 Cyber-Tec at iTunes

1995 debut EPs
C-Tec albums
Fifth Colvmn Records EPs
Synthetic Symphony EPs